Oxychilus draparnaudi, or Draparnaud's glass snail, is a species of small land snail, a terrestrial pulmonate gastropod mollusc in the family Oxychilidae, the glass snails.

Description

Oxychilus draparnaudi is large for a zonitid glass snail, also called the dark-bodied glass snail with a shell of about 14 mm in maximum dimension. The shell is glossy and is a translucent yellowish-brown and gold in color, somewhat whiter underneath.

The visible soft parts of the animal are a very unusual strong dark blue, mixed with grey.

Distribution
This species occurs in countries and islands including:
 Czech Republic
 Slovakia
 Ukraine
 Great Britain
 Ireland
 Singapore
 Hawaii
and other areas

Synonyms
Synonyms include Oxychilus drapanaldi, Oxychilus lucidum, Helix lucida, Helix nitida, Helicella draparnaldi, and Polita draparnaldi.

References

External links

Oxychilus draparnaudi at Animalbase taxonomy,short description, distribution, biology,status (threats), images

draparnaudi
Gastropods described in 1837